This is the list of members elected in the 2017 Constituent National Assembly of Venezuela following the 30 July 2017 elections. The first session of the assembly began on 4 August 2017 in the Oval Room of the Palacio Federal Legislativo. The Democratic Unity Roundtable—the opposition to the incumbent ruling party—also boycotted the election claiming that the Constituent Assembly was "a trick to keep [the incumbent ruling party] in power." Since the opposition did not participate in the election, the incumbent Great Patriotic Pole, dominated by the United Socialist Party of Venezuela, won almost all seats in the assembly by default (503 out of 545 seats).

On 8 August 2017, the Constituent Assembly declared itself to be the government branch with supreme power in Venezuela, banning the opposition-led National Assembly from performing actions that would interfere with the assembly while continuing to pass measures in "support and solidarity" with President Maduro. On 18 August 2017, the Constituent Assembly gave itself the power to pass legislation and override the National Assembly on issues concerning “preservation of peace, security, sovereignty, the socio-economic and financial system”  and then stripped the National Assembly of its legislative powers the following day. The opposition-led National Assembly responded, stating it would not recognize the Constituent Assembly.

As of May 2019, the Constituent Assembly mandate is expected to expire on 31 December 2020, a measure that replaces the previous resolution of August 2017 that established its validity for at least two years.

Presidency

President 
 Delcy Rodríguez (2017–18)
 Diosdado Cabello (2018–present)

First Vice President 
 Elvis Amoroso (2017)
 Aristóbulo Istúriz (2017–18)
 Tania Díaz (2018–present)

Second Vice President 
 Isaías Rodríguez (2017)
 Elvis Amoroso (2017–18)
 Gladys Requena (2018–present)

Presidential commission 

Other members include:
Nicolás Maduro Guerra – son of President Nicolás Maduro
Carmen Meléndez – former Minister of Defense
On 4 September 2017, Earle Herrera, the president of a Constituency commission, resigned, alleging sectarianism during the election of the commission presidents, which he did not agree with.

Constituent Members

Capital District (Distrito Capital) 
 Cilia Flores
 Delcy Rodríguez
 Iris Varela
 Jesus Faría Tortosa
 Juan Carlos Alemán Pérez
 Luis Rafael Durán Gamboa
 Ángelo Eduar Rivas Rivas

Amazonas 
 Atures Municipality: Miguel Rodríguez y Antonio José Rumbos Oviedo
 Atabapo Municipality: Eneida Leini Rivas Delgado
 Maroa Municipality: Fernando Henriquez
 Manapiare Municipality: Frank León Pérez

Anzoátegui 
 Simón Bolívar Municipality: Aristóbulo Istúriz Almeida and Nigel del Valle Barrolleta Carvajal
 Aragua Municipality: Juan de Dios Figueredo González
 Anaco Municipality: Francisco Solórzano
 Bruzual Municipality: Luis José Marcano Salazar
 Freites Municipality: Hernán Rodríguez
 Independencia Municipality: Carlos Eduardo Vargas
 Libertad Municipality: Luis Antonio Fernández León
 Miranda Municipality: Carlos José Andrade Salazar
 Monagas Municipality: José Gregorio Rivero Romero
 Peñalver Municipality: Alexander Rafael Zabala Zabala
 Simón Rodríguez Municipality: Earle Herrera Silva
 Sotillo Municipality: Ingrid Cortez González
 Guanipa Municipality: Ana Rosa Sánchez de Martínez
 Guanta Municipality: Herminia García Ron
 Píritu Municipality: William Antonio Petit
 Urbaneja Municipality: Luis Vásquez
 Carvajal Municipality: José Miguel Figueroa
 Santa Ana Municipality: Fredy Ramón Fernández Bernal
 Capistrano Municipality: María de Los Ángeles Travieso
 Mac Gregor Municipality: Hernán José Zurita
 Cajigal Municipality: Antonio José Goffin Molero

Apure 
 San Fernando  Municipality: Germán Eduardo Piñate Rodríguez and Héctor Orlando Zambrano
 Pedro Camejo Municipality: Alinne Rafael Rodríguez Martínez
 Achaguas Municipality: Cesar Temistocle Galipolly Laya
 Rómulo Gallegos Municipality: Enma Graciela Díaz De Solórzano
 Muñoz Municipality: Yoel Lisandro Solórzano

Aragua 
 Girardot  Municipality: Ricardo Antonio Molina Peñaloza and Roque Valero Pérez
 Bolívar Municipality: Elisa Gómez
 Camatagua Municipality: Humelvis Gutiérrez
 Libertador Municipality: Jesús Pérez
 Ribas Municipality: Rosa León
 Francisco Linares Alcántara Municipality: Ismael Morales
 Mario Briceño Iragorry Municipality: Víctor Flores
 Zamora Municipality: Rodulfo Pérez
 Lamas Municipality: Quember Piña
 Revenga Municipality: Leanci Tovar
 Costa de Oro Municipality: Antonio Guanipa
 San Casimiro Municipality: Mayker López
 Mariño Municipality: Joana Sánchez
 San Sebastián Municipality: Félix Romero
 Sucre Municipality: Elvis Amoroso
 Santos Michelena Municipality: Víctor Trejo
 Tovar Municipality: Ignacio Kanzler
 Urdaneta Municipality: Aidelys Oyon

Barinas 
 Barinas  Municipality: Adán Chávez and Argenis Aldazoro
 Arismendi Municipality: Rafael Rojas
 Andrés Eloy Blanco Municipality: Sergio Uzcátegui
 Bolívar Municipality: Luis Núñez
 Cruz Paredes Municipality: Alfredo Chirinos
 Obispos Municipality: Marly Aparicio
 Rojas Municipality: Jorge Salcedo
 Sosa Municipality: Argenis Durán
 Sucre Municipality: Víctor Guerrero
 Ezequiel Zamora Municipality: Yovanny Barrera Bencomo
 Alberto Arvelo Torrealba Municipality: Arnoldo Avancini
 Pedraza Municipality: Kedwin Albarrán

Bolívar 
 Heres  Municipality: Rubén Eladio Pinto and Victoria Mercedes Mata García
 Caroní Municipality: Richard Rosa
 Sifontes Municipality: Anioli Josefina Martínez
 Gran Sabana Municipality: Cecilio Pérez Peña
 Roscio Municipality: Wuihelm Torrellas
 Sucre Municipality: Alberto Aray

Carabobo 
 Valencia  Municipality: Francisco José Ameliach Orta and Juan Carlos Otaiza Castillo
 Libertador Municipality: Saúl Ortega Campos
 Naguanagua Municipality: Busy Galeano
 San Diego Municipality: Jorge Delgado
 Los Guayos Municipality: Douglas Romero Arcila
 Carlos Arvelo Municipality: Héctor Agüero
 Guacara Municipality: Edgar Arteaga Matute
 San Joaquín Municipality: Jorge Gregorio Muñoz
 Diego Ibarra Municipality: Rafael Ramos
 Bejuma Municipality: Neider Lara Graterol
 Montalbán Municipality: Tarcia Morillo
 Miranda Municipality: Juan Carlos López
 Puerto Cabello Municipality: Basew Asfur Yhmaidan
 Juan José Mora Municipality: Yildre Villegas

Cojedes 
 Ezequiel Zamora  Municipality: Érika del Valle Farías Peña and Jorge Adrián Pérez Jiménez
 Tinaquillo Municipality: Asdrúbal Salazar
 Lima Blanco Municipality: Nosliw Rodríguez
 Girardot Municipality: Luis Gerardo Ramírez
 Anzoátegui Municipality: José Gregorio Herrera
 Ricaurte Municipality: María Adela Ramírez
 Rómulo Gallegos Municipality: Hilda Yamilet Prieto
 Tinaco Municipality: Adelaida Párraga

Delta Amacuro 
 Tucupita  Municipality: Pedro Carreño y Carlos Enrique Gómez
 Antonio Díaz Municipality: Amado Antonio Heredia Bolaño
 Pedernales Municipality: Zaida Maita
 Páez Municipality: Yrenia Dayana Rivera Bustamante

Falcón 
 Miranda  Municipality: Víctor José Clark Boscán and Ana Carolina Brea de Cova
 Acosta Municipality: Henry Estrada.
 Bolívar Municipality: José Chirinos
 Buchivacoa Municipality: Bellirde Morales 
 Colina Municipality: Charly García
 Democracia Municipality: Teresa Romero
 Federación Municipality: Wilmer García
 Carirubana Municipality: Miriam González
 Los Taques Municipality: Juan Simón Primera
 Falcón Municipality: Humberto Clark
 Silva Municipality: Eduardo Rodríguez
 Mauroa Municipality: José Chirinos
 Zamora Municipality: Nataly Hernández
 Dabajuro Municipality: Fiorella Leal
 Monseñor Iturriza Municipality: Efren Borges
 Píritu Municipality: Andrés Eloy Méndez
 Petit Municipality: Erick Coronado Galicia
 San Francisco Municipality: Milagros Sequera
 Jacura Municipality: Luis Bello
 Palmasola Municipality: Juan Pablo Rangel
 Tocópero Municipality: Carolina Díaz
 Urumaco Municipality: David Josué De Jesús Díaz
 Unión Municipality: Francisco Arturo Herrera
 Sucre Municipality: Norvis Tobías Rojas
 Cacique Manaure Municipality: Deibis Jesús Sandoval

Guárico 
 Roscio  Municipality: Christhoper Constant Campos and Alexander García
 Chaguaramas Municipality: Lismar Carpio
 Pedro Zaraza Municipality: Adrián Maestre
 Santa María de Ipire Municipality: Guillermo Cedeño
 Ortiz Municipality: Pedro Suárez
 Las Mercedes del Llano Municipality: José Leopoldo Matos
 Leonardo Infante Municipality: Frang Morales
 Francisco de Miranda Municipality: Fernando Ríos
 Julián Mellado Municipality: César Gómez
 El Socorro Municipality: Juan Carlos Flores
 José Tadeo Monagas Municipality: Julio César Rivero
 Esteros de Camaguán Municipality: Gilberto Enrique Rivero
 San Gerónimo de Guayabal Municipality: Ruluc Solórzano
 San José de Guaribe Municipality: Rafael Solórzano
 José Félix Ribas Municipality: Ramón Magallanes

Lara 
 Iribarren  Municipality: Carmen Teresa Meléndez Rivas and Luis Jonás Reyes Flores
 Torres Municipality: Julio Chávez Meléndez
 Palavecino Municipality: Derbys Guédez Torres
 Crespo Municipality: Julio Alejandro Garcés
 Morán Municipality: Gisela Rodríguez
 Urdaneta Municipality: Nolberto Palmera Piña
 Jiménez Municipality: Jean Carlos Rodríguez
 Simón Planas Municipality: Ángel Prado Padua
 Andrés Eloy Blanco Municipality: Wilmer GranadilloF

Mérida 
 Libertador  Municipality: Yehison José Guzmán Araque and Simón Pablo Figueroa
 Alberto Adriani Municipality: Omar Sánchez Escalante
 Andrés Bello Municipality: Junior Avari Avendaño
 Arzobispo Chacón Municipality: Carlos Méndez Perdomo
 Campo Elías Municipality: Pedro Álvarez Rivas
 Julio César Salas Municipality: José Gutiérrez Hernández
 Justo Briceño Municipality: Luis Mateus Sánchez
 Santos Marquina Municipality: Bélgica Hungría Medina
 Antonio Pinto Salinas Municipality: José Rodríguez Márquez
 Obispo Ramos De Lora Municipality: Carlos Arellano Díaz
 Caracciolo Parra Olmedo Municipality: Luis Hiza Andrade
 Cardenal Quintero Municipality: Gerania Quintero Cuevas
 Rangel Municipality: Luis Espinoza Villamizar
 Rivas Dávila Municipality: Luis Martí Hernández
 Sucre Municipality: Mervin Maldonado
 Tovar Municipality: José Molina García
 Tulio Febres Cordero Municipality: José Gregorio Araujo
 Padre Noguera Municipality: Omar Antonio Contreras
 Aricagua Municipality: Martín Araque Escalona
 Miranda Municipality: Yusmary Rivas
 Pueblo Llano Municipality: Carlos Emiliano Salcedo
 Zea Municipality: Francisco Javier Peña Ochoa

Miranda 
 Guaicaipuro  Municipality: Wisely Álvarez and Ricardo Sánchez
 Acevedo Municipality: Nora Delgado
 Brión Municipality: Modesto Ruiz
 Independencia Municipality: Ismael Capinel
 Tomás Lander Municipality: Genkever Tovar
 Páez Municipality: Héctor Rodríguez
 Paz Castillo Municipality: Erick Lovera
 Plaza Municipality: Julián Rodríguez
 Sucre Municipality: José Ignacio Rangel Ávalos
 Baruta Municipality: Francisco González
 Urdaneta Municipality: Gabriela Simoza
 Zamora Municipality: Hermann Escarrá
 Cristóbal Rojas Municipality: Leonardo Montezuma
 Los Salias Municipality: José Ramón Martínez
 Andrés Bello Municipality: Álvaro Hidalgo
 Chacao Municipality: Luz Marina Ramírez
 Simón Bolívar Municipality: Héctor Mijares
 Carrizal Municipality: Jhorman Vargas
 Pedro Gual Municipality: Eligio Kiaro Díaz
 Buroz Municipality: Yohan Ponce
 El Hatillo Municipality: Gerardo Enrique Melo

Monagas 
 Maturín  Municipality: Diosdado Cabello Rondón and Ernesto Javier Luna González
 Libertador Municipality: Régulo José Reina
 Uracoa Municipality: Ernesto José Ruiz
 Sotillo Municipality: José Elias Bellorín
 Aguasay Municipality: Virgilio Elías Aguilera
 Santa Barbara Municipality: Rony Rafael Ruiz
 Ezequiel Zamora Municipality: Omar José Farías
 Cedeño Municipality: Adriana Josefina Veliz
 Acosta Municipality: Maria Gabriela Villaroel
 Piar Municipality: José Norberto Arévalo
 Caripe Municipality: Gustavo Adolfo Narváez
 Bolívar Municipality: Cirilo Antonio Rodríguez
 Punceres Municipality: Eddys David Aponte

Nueva Esparta 
 Arismendi  Municipality: Hantony Rafael Cohello Bello and Maira Josefina Velásquez López
 Antolín del Campo Municipality: Rafael Salazar
 Marcano Municipality: Karina Aguilera
 Maneiro Municipality: Rino Machado
 Península de Macanao Municipality: Eliézka Millán
 Tubores Municipality: Gustavo Salazar
 Mariño Municipality: Yul Armas
 Gómez Municipality: Eleonor Vásquez
 Villalba Municipality: Luis Emilio Romero
 García Municipality: Edith Cardona
 Díaz Municipality: José del Carmen Millán

Portuguesa 
 Genaro Boconoíto Municipality: Evelio Montilla Durán
 Papelón Municipality: Yidagna Dayana Mena
 Santa Rosalía Municipality: Yaneth López
 José Vicente de Una Municipality: Franklin Alexis González

Sucre 
 Sucre  Municipality: Gilberto Pinto Blanco and Tania Valentina Díaz
 Bolívar Municipality: Francisco Antonio Sánchez
 Bermúdez Municipality: Carmen González
 Cruz Salmerón Acosta Municipality: Erick Mago
 Montes Municipality: Eustorgio Bello
 Cajigal Municipality: Félix Barrios
 Mejía Municipality: Yonny Rafael Patiño Rivas

Táchira 
 San Cristóbal  Municipality: Temistocles Salazar and Gerardo Barrera
 Miranda Municipality: Tulio Vivas
 Ayacucho Municipality: Ana Maryoly Ramírez Sayago
 Jáuregui Municipality: César Macario Sandoval
 Samuel Maldonado Municipality: Eduardo Antonio Jaimes
 Torbes Municipality: Edwin Rueda
 Andrés Bello Municipality: Javier Duarte Gerdel
 Antonio Rómulo Acosta Municipality: Genyi Sánchez
 Bolívar Municipality: Miguel Puche
 Cardenas Municipality: Gerzon González
 Córdoba Municipality: Jessica Moreno
 Fernández Feo Municipality: Hebert Delgado
 García de Hevia Municipality: Yorlet Gil
 Guásimos Municipality: Yeshosua Faratro
 Independencia Municipality: Eleazar López
 José María Vargas Municipality: Johnny Roa
 Junín Municipality: Víctor Ballesteros
 Libertad Municipality: Williams Parada
 Libertador Municipality: Julio García Zerpa
 Lobatera Municipality: Johana Rosales
 Michelena Municipality: Ely Pernía
 Panamericano Municipality: Flor Ramírez
 Pedro María Ureña Municipality: Ely Serrano Fontana
 Rafael Urdaneta Municipality: Raúl Villamizar
 San Judas Tadeo Municipality: Freddy Zambrano
 Seboruco Municipality: Jesús Ramírez
 Simón Rodríguez Municipality: Elimar Ramírez
 Sucre Municipality: José Manuel Chacón
 Uribante Municipality: Alexis Ramírez

Trujillo 
 Trujillo  Municipality: Irayluz Terán and Angerson Hernández
 Rafael Rangel Municipality: Jean Carlos Olmos
 Boconó Municipality: Yolmar Gudiño
 Carache Municipality: Milagros Moreno
 Escuque Municipality: Tomás Lucena
 Urdaneta Municipality: Alexis González
 Valera Municipality: Zoraida Gil
 Candelaria Municipality: Alba Nieves
 Miranda Municipality: Loengri Matehus
 Monte Carmelo Municipality: Héctor Peña
 Montalbán Municipality: Janeth Araujo
 Pampán Municipality: Stalin Nava
 San Rafael de Carvajal Municipality: Wilsson Marín
 Sucre Municipality: Victoria Araujo
 Andrés Bello Municipality: José Reyes
 Bolívar Municipality: Alirio Rangel
 José Felipe Márquez Cañizález Municipality: Jean Carlos Fuentes
 Campo Elías Municipality: Gerardo Márquez
 La Ceiba Municipality: Darlin José Moreno
 Pampanito Municipality: Ledy Torres

Vargas 
 Vargas Municipality: Ramón Darío Vivas Velasco and Juan Alejandro Iriarte Ortiz

Yaracuy 
 San Felipe  Municipality: Carlos Gamarra and Lilian Rodríguez
 Bolívar Municipality: Angélica Sánchez
 Bruzual Municipality: Adelmo León
 Nirgua Municipality: Jaydee Huérfano
 Sucre Municipality: Luis Sierra
 Urachiche Municipality: Omar Oviedo
 José Antonio Páez Municipality: Freddy Narváez
 La Trinidad Municipality: Mirlen Ramírez
 Cocorote Municipality: Adonay Romero
 Independencia Municipality: Nestor León
 Arístides Bastidas Municipality: Francisco Daza
 Manuel Monge Municipality: Martín Corbo
 Veroes Municipality: Santos Aguilar
 Peña Municipality: Isidro García

Zulia 
 Maracaibo Municipality: Willy Jakson Casanova Campos and Fidel Madroñero
 San Francisco Municipality: Lisandro Cabello
 Mara Municipality: Sergio Fuenmayor
 Colón Municipality: Blagdimir Labrador
 Cabimas Municipality: Frank Carreño
 Jesús Enrique Lossada Municipality: Sinecio Junior Mujíca
 Guajira Municipality: Fermín Montiel
 Santa Rita Municipality: Mairelys Barboza
 Jesús María Semprún Municipality: Keirineth Fernández
 Baralt Municipality: Samuel Contreras Blanco
 Miranda Municipality: José Medina
 Sucre Municipality: Gulliver Antunez Montero
 La Cañada de Urdaneta Municipality: Johnny Bracho
 Lagunillas Municipality: José Luis Bermúdez
 Valmore Rodríguez Municipality: Javier Briceño
 Almirante Padilla Municipality: Alberto Sobalvarro
 Simón Bolívar Municipality: Joseph Parra
 Rosario de Perijá Municipality: Esmeidi Josefina González 
 Catatumbo Municipality: Oladis Villasmil
 Francisco Javier Pulgar Municipality: Yendire Granados
 Machiques de Perijá Municipality: Anuar Younese Maali

Sectoral constituent members 
Below are the people who make up the National Constituent Assembly for each sector:

Workers

Public Administration Sector 
 Alexis José Corredor Pérez
 David Enrique Freitez Garrido
 Diva Ylayaly Guzmán León
 Elbano de Jesús Sánchez Pérez
 Emigdio Hernán Iriarte Bolívar
 Esteban Steve Arvelo Ruiz
 Euclides Amador Campos Aponte
 Fernando Ernesto Rivero Osuna
 Franklin Salvador Rondón Mata
 Gerdul Alberto Gutiérrez Azuaje
 Jacobo Torres De León
 Luis Enrique Araujo Noguera
 Nicolás Ernesto Maduro Guerra
 Pedro Miguel Arias Palacios
 Ricardo Alberto Moreno Sosa
 Roberto Jesús García Messuti
 Willian Rafael Gil Calderón

Commerce and Banking Sector 
 Avilio José Echenique
 Deibi Javier Ocanto Vegas
 Eglé de los Santos Sánchez
 Elia Ramona Díaz
 Eliana Rosa Leal Natera
 Frank José Quijada Carmona
 Jesús Alberto Guédez Peña
 José Gregorio González Figueroa
 Lili Josefina Rincón Urdaneta
 María Isolina Leonet Navarro
 Olinda Mirella Peroza

Construction Sector 
 Francisco Javier García Aarón
 José Orlando Bracca Barrera
 Marco Tulio Díaz
 Raúl Ernesto Román Marín

Popular and Independent Economy Sector 
 Alberto José Aranguibel Brito
 Alexis José Tovar
 Carmen Tibisay Márquez de Miranda
 Emma Elinor Cesin Centeno
 Gino González
 José Misael Chaurán Hernández
 Loa Daniela Rivas Díaz
 María Alejandra Díaz Marín
 Mario Silva García
 Orlando Antonio Castillo Chirivella
 Sol Elena Mussett de Primera

Industries Sector 
 Ángel Bautista Marcano Castillo
 Ernesto Agustín Rivero Cañas
 Frank Reinaldo Márquez López
 Gleiman Rafael Vanegas Moreno
 José Gregorio Gil Armas
 Yahirys Karminia Rivas Freites

Oil and Mining Sector 
 Sandra María Nieves
 Wils Asención Rangel Linares

Services Sector 
 Betssy Carolina Rivero Sarmiento
 Ernesto Jesús Antonio Rodríguez Guerra
 Fernando Augusto de Sousa Morales
 José David Mora
 José Rafael Novoa Jiménez
 Juan José Salazar Agreda
 Laura Nohely Alarcón Vera
 Luis Rafael Carrero Abarca
 Luz Coromoto Chacón Mendoza
 Mercedes Coromoto Gutiérrez Muñoz
 Nelson Jesús Herrera Pérez
 Raúl Antonio Ordóñez Paz
 Richard Verde Briceño
 Williams Edgardo Golindano Cedeño

Social Sector 
 Alcides Antonio Castillo Jiménez
 Carlos Enrique López Sánchez
 Esther Tamar Quiaro Vargas
 Gregoria Caridad Laya Morgado
 Octavio Nicolás Solórzano
 Orlando Enrique Pérez Oropeza
 Oswaldo Emilio Vera Rojas
 Rafael Anaximenes Torrealba Ojeda
 Rodbexa Mercedes Poleo Vidoza
 Sandino Rafael Primera Mussett
 Telémaco Ramón Figueroa
 Zulay Josefina Maestre de Acosta

Transport Sector 
 Edison Alberto Alvarado Gil
 Francisco Alejandro Torrealba Ojeda

Pensioners

Capital Region 
 Aleydys Argelia Manaure de Costas
 David Rafael Paravisini García
 Gladys del Valle Requena
 Israel Alberto López Rodríguez
 Julio Rafael Escalona Ojeda
 Néstor José Francia Echenique
 Rafael José Argotty Zambrano

Indigenous communities 
People who make up the National Constituent Assembly, elected by indigenous peoples and communities in accordance with their ancestral customs and practices in general assemblies, in three established regions:

Western region 
 Aloha Joselyn Núñez Gutiérrez
 Noelí Pocaterra de Oberto
 Indira Celina Fernández Duarte
 Freddy José Panapera Jorgito

Eastern region 
 Clara Josefina Vidal de Pérez
 Zoila Milagros Yánez
 Elías Rafael Romero

Southern region 
José Nelson Mavio Martínez

See also 
 Members of the 1999 National Constituent Assembly of Venezuela
 2017 Constituent National Assembly

References 

Venezuela politics-related lists